Asian Americans have been involved in sports for as long as they have existed. They have had careers in the NFL, Olympics, PGA Tour, NBA, and many more global sports organizations. Athletes like Tommy Kono, Tiger Woods, Apolo Ohno, and Kristi Yamaguchi have been seen as trailblazers and game-changers in their sports. They have gone from breaking color barriers in the NHL and NBA  to becoming world champions in their respective sports.

Basketball
Wataru Misaka broke the BAA (the precursor to the NBA) color barrier when he played for the New York Knicks in the 1947–48 season.  Prior to his brief professional career, Misaka helped lead the Utah Utes to victories in the 1944 NCAA and 1947 NIT championships.  Another Asian American NBA player was Raymond Townsend. Townsend played for the Golden State Warriors and Indiana Pacers from 1978 to 1982. Rex Walters played from 1993 to 2000 with the Nets, Philadelphia 76ers and Miami Heat; he was the head coach for the University of San Francisco basketball team. After playing basketball at Harvard University, point guard Jeremy Lin signed with the NBA's Golden State Warriors in 2010 and won an NBA Championship with the Toronto Raptors in the 2018-2019 NBA season. Lin also played in the NBA G League with the Santa Cruz Warriors, before signing with the Beijing Ducks in 2021.  Jordan Clarkson of the Utah Jazz is also of partial Filipino-American descent.

Current Kansas Jayhawks assistant coach Kurtis Townsend is Raymond Townsend's brother.

Erik Spoelstra, whose mother is Filipino, became the youngest coach ever in NBA history. He is currently the head coach of the Miami Heat.

Bobby Webster, whose mother is Japanese American, is currently serving as general manager for the Toronto Raptors of the NBA.

Multisport Athletes

Wally Yonamine played professionally in the NFL for a single season with the San Francisco 49ers in 1947. In his one season with the team, he had 19 carries for 74 yards and caught 3 passes for 40 yards. After his brief career in the NFL Yonamine traveled overseas to play baseball. In 1951, he became the first American to play professional baseball in Japan, leading off for the Yomiuri Giants.

Hines Ward, who was of Korean descent, played both football and baseball. Prior to playing wide receiver at the University of Georgia, Ward was drafted by the Miami Marlins and offered a $25,000 signing bonus. He was drafted 92nd overall in the NFL draft by the Pittsburgh Steelers and played all 14 seasons for the organization. Ward was also notable for his speaking out against discrimination issues that were occurring in his birthplace of South Korea.

Walter "Sneeze" Achiu was the first person of east Asian descent to play in the National Football League. At the University of Dayton, he was a three-sport athlete participating in football, baseball, and track. Walter Achiu was inducted into the University of Dayton Hall of Fame in 1974. After his time in the NFL, Achiu went on to become a professional wrestling champion when he competed in the 1950s.

Football
Norm Chow was the head coach for the University of Hawaii from 2012 to 2015 and former offensive coordinator for UCLA from 2008 and 2010 after a short stint with the Tennessee Titans of the NFL, after 23 years of coaching other college teams, including four years as offensive coordinator at USC.

From 1923-1926, Arthur Matsu, who was of Japanese and Scottish descent, was the quarterback for The College of William & Mary football team. Matsu played one season professionally with the Dayton Triangle, before embarking on a coaching career.

In 1962, half-Filipino Roman Gabriel was the first Asian American to be drafted as an NFL quarterback. Dat Nguyen was an NFL middle linebacker who was an all-pro selection in 2003 for the Dallas Cowboys. In 1998, he was named an All-American and won the Bednarik Award as well as the Lombardi Award, while playing for Texas A&M University. Hines Ward, who was born to a Korean mother and an African American father, is a former NFL wide receiver who was the MVP of Super Bowl XL. Ward also won the 12th season of the Dancing with the Stars television series.

Former Patriots linebacker Tedy Bruschi is of Filipino and Italian descent. While playing for the Patriots, Bruschi won three Super Bowl rings and was a two-time All-Pro selection. Bruschi is currently an NFL analyst at ESPN. Younghoe Koo, the current kicker for the Atlanta Falcons, was born in South Korea and is the fourth player in NFL history to have been born in South Korea. 2018 Heisman Trophy winner, 1st overall pick of the 2019 NFL Draft and Arizona Cardinals quarterback Kyler Murray is of partial Korean descent.

Mixed martial arts

In 2004, UFC President Dana White called Bruce Lee, who was born in San Francisco, the "father of mixed martial arts". 

There are several top ranked Asian American mixed martial artists. BJ Penn is a former UFC lightweight and welterweight champion. Cung Le is a former Strikeforce middleweight champion. Benson Henderson is the former WEC lightweight champion and a former UFC lightweight champion. Nam Phan is a UFC featherweight fighter.

Olympics

Asian Americans first made an impact in Olympic sports in the late 1940s and in the 1950s. Victoria Manalo Draves won both gold in platform and springboard diving in the 1948 Olympics, becoming the first Asian American to earn a gold medal.  Sammy Lee became the first Asian American man to earn an Olympic Gold Medal (two days after Draves), winning in platform diving in both 1948 and 1952. Harold Sakata won a weightlifting silver medal in the 1948 Olympics, while Tommy Kono (weightlifting), Yoshinobu Oyakawa (100-meter backstroke) and Ford Konno (1500-meter freestyle) each won gold and set Olympic records in the 1952 Olympics. Konno won another gold and silver swimming medal at the same Olympics and added a silver medal in 1956, while Kono set another Olympic weightlifting record in 1956. Also at the 1952 Olympics, Evelyn Kawamoto won two bronze medals in swimming.

Eric Sato won gold (1988) and bronze (1992) medals in volleyball, while his sister Liane Sato won bronze in the same sport in 1992. Brothers Kawika and Erik Shoji won bronze medals in volleyball in 2016.

Amy Chow was a member of the gold medal women's gymnastics team at the 1996 Olympics; she also won an individual silver medal on the uneven bars. Gymnast Mohini Bhardwaj won a team silver medal in the 2004 Olympics. Bryan Clay who is of half Japanese descent won the decathlon gold medal in the 2008 Olympics, the silver medal in the 2004 Olympics, and was the sport's 2005 world champion.

Since Tiffany Chin won the women's US Figure Skating Championship in 1985, Asian Americans have been prominent in that sport. Kristi Yamaguchi won three national championships, two world titles, and the 1992 Olympic Gold medal. Michelle Kwan has won nine national championships and five world titles, as well as two Olympic medals (silver in 1998, bronze in 2002). At the 2018 Winter Olympics, Mirai Nagasu became the first American woman to land the triple axel in Olympic competition. Nathan Chen won a gold medal in the men's figure skating singles competition at the 2022 Winter Olympics.

Apolo Ohno, who is of half Japanese descent, is a short track speed skater and an eight-time Olympic medalist as well as the most decorated American Winter Olympic athlete of all time. He became the youngest U.S. national champion in 1997 and was the reigning champion from 2001 to 2009, winning the title a total of 12 times. In 1999, he became the youngest skater to win a World Cup event title, and became the first American to win a World Cup overall title in 2001, which he won again in 2003 and 2005. He won his first overall World Championship title at the 2008 championships.

Chloe Kim won gold medals in snowboarding at the 2018 and 2022 Winter Olympics.

Nathan Adrian, who is a hapa of half Chinese descent, is a professional American swimmer and three-time Olympic gold medalist who currently holds the American record in the 50 and 100-yard freestyle (short course) events. He has won a total of fifteen medals in major international competitions, twelve gold, two silver, and one bronze spanning the Olympics, the World, and the Pan Pacific Championships.

Hmong American Sunisa Lee won the 2020 Olympics all-around gymnastics gold medal during the Tokyo Olympics.

List of medalists

Other sports

Bobby Balcena was a Filipino American athlete from San Pedro, CA. He had a 15 year career in the minor leagues from 1948-1963. He played outfielder with the Wichita Indians, San Antonio Missions, Kansas City Blues, Buffalo Bisons, Dallas Rangers, Vancouver Mounties, Hawaii Islanders, Toronto Maple Leafs and Seattle Rainiers. In 1956, Bobby Balcena became the first Asian American to play in Major League Baseball, playing two games for the Cincinnati Redlegs. He died in 1990 and until then had been the only Filipino American to play in Major League Baseball.

Japanese American Kurt Suzuki is currently playing Major League Baseball for the Los Angeles Angels baseball club. Other current Major League Baseball players with Asian American backgrounds include: Keston Hiura, Jordan Yamamoto, Connor Joe and Rob Refsnyder.

Current National Hockey League players with Asian American backgrounds include: Kailer Yamamoto, brothers Kiefer and Kole Sherwood, and brothers Jason and Nick Robertson.

In long distance running, Miki Gorman won the Boston and New York City marathons twice in the 1970s. A former American record holder at the distance, she is the only woman to win both races twice, and is one of only two women to win both marathons in the same year.

Michael Chang was a top-ranked tennis player for most of his career. He was seen as an underdog standing at 5'9 and weighing only 150 pounds. He was the youngest tennis player to be ranked among the five best players in the world. Chang was fifteen years old when he went from juniors to professional. He became the youngest to win a match at the U.S. Open and go to the semifinals. He went pro in 1988 and in 1989, at the age of seventeen, he became the youngest player ever to win the French Open, and the first American to win the event since 1955. Chang gained an estimated $18 million from tournament winnings excluding product endorsements. 

Tiger Woods, an Afro-Asian, is the most successful golfer of his generation and one of the most famous athletes in the world. In 1997, at the age of 21, he became the youngest and the first African American to win the U.S. Masters. Woods made his first appearance in the British Open later that year and tied the course record of 64. He won another 13 majors and was named the PGA Player of the Year 10 times over the next 12 years. His most recent major victory was at the 2019 US Masters after many doubted his return. Later that year, Woods won the Zozo Championship to tie Sam Snead's PGA Tour record of 82 victories. Tiger Woods has gained more than $118 million in career earnings and having an estimated net worth of $800 million. 

Eric Koston is one of the top street skateboarders and placed first in the 2003 X-Games street competition. Richard Park is a Korean American ice hockey player who currently plays for the Swiss team HC Ambri-Piotta.

Brian Ching, whose father was Chinese, represented the United States Men's National Soccer Team, scoring 11 goals in 45 caps. He participated in the 2006 World Cup and won the 2007 Gold Cup.

Julie Chu, who is three-quarters Chinese and one-quarter Puerto Rican, is an American Olympic ice hockey player who played for the United States women's ice hockey team. She was also the US Olympic Team Flag Bearer for the 2014 Winter Olympic Closing Ceremonies.

Kyle Larson became the first driver of Asian descent to win in the NASCAR Cup Series in 2016. He was also the first Asian to win a NASCAR touring series championship, winning the 2012 NASCAR K&N Pro Series East title.

See also
List of Asian Americans: Sports

Notes

References

Asian-American culture